Laghée (literally "of the Lake") is a dialect of Western Lombard language spoken in the north of province of Como (Lombardy), on the coast of the eponymous lake.

Singer Davide Van De Sfroos uses a diluted koine inspired by the Laghée dialect as his preferred language for lyrics.

Footnotes 

Western Lombard language